Luigi Filippo D'Amico (9 October 1924 – 28 April 2007) was an Italian film director and screenwriter. His 1974 film Il domestico was shown as part of a retrospective on Italian comedy at the 67th Venice International Film Festival.

Selected filmography
 Eager to Live (1953)
 House of Ricordi (1954)
 Bravissimo (1955)
The President of Borgorosso Football Club (1970)
 Amore e ginnastica (1973)
 Il domestico (1974) 
 L'arbitro (1974)

References

External links
Obituary on Corriere.it

1924 births
2007 deaths
Italian film directors